Tunnelton station is a historic railway station located at Tunnelton, Preston County, West Virginia. It was built in 1912–1913, by the Baltimore and Ohio Railroad Company.  It is a rectangular, one-story brick structure.  The exterior walls are constructed of brick, stone and mortar, with ornate wood soffit, extended wood fascia, and Spanish style ceramic roof tile, topped with large tile caps. Passenger service ceased in 1968, and in 1994, it was purchased from CSX by the Tunnelton Historical Society.

It was listed on the National Register of Historic Places in 1996 as the Tunnelton Railroad Depot.

References

Railway stations on the National Register of Historic Places in West Virginia
Railway stations in the United States opened in 1913
Railway stations closed in 1968
Buildings and structures in Preston County, West Virginia
Former Baltimore and Ohio Railroad stations
Buildings designated early commercial in the National Register of Historic Places in West Virginia
National Register of Historic Places in Preston County, West Virginia
1913 establishments in West Virginia
Former railway stations in West Virginia